RNA-binding protein 14 is a protein that in humans is encoded by the RBM14 gene.

Interactions 

RBM14 has been shown to interact with TARBP2.

Model organisms 

Model organisms have been used in the study of RBM14 function. A conditional knockout mouse line called Rbm14tm1a(KOMP)Wtsi was generated at the Wellcome Trust Sanger Institute. Male and female animals underwent a standardized phenotypic screen to determine the effects of deletion. Additional screens performed:  - In-depth immunological phenotyping

References

Further reading